Lennox Lewis vs. Andrew Golota was a professional boxing match contested on October 4, 1997, for the WBC Heavyweight Championship.

Background
After making the first successful defense in his second reign as WBC Heavyweight champion against the previously undefeated Henry Akinwande, Lennox Lewis agreed to make his second defense against controversial Polish fighter Andrew Golota. Golota was coming off two consecutive disqualification losses to Riddick Bowe. Golota had dominated the action in both fights and lead on all of the judge's scorecards before landing multiple low blows on Bowe that caused the referee to stop the fight both times. Initially, Golota was to face Olympic Gold Medalist Ray Mercer after his second fight with Bowe, but a neck injury forced Mercer to forgo the match and Golota was able to come to an agreement for a title fight with Lewis instead. Prior to the bout, Lewis' manager Frank Maloney accused Golota of steroid use and asked that he be tested for banned substances, but Golota was found to be clean.

The fight
Though it was thought that the match would be a back-and-forth contest between two of boxing's top heavyweights, it instead became one of the most lopsided championship fights in the sport's history. As soon as the fight started, Lewis had Golota on the defensive by effectively using his strong left jab and as the first minute of the fight came to close, was able to land a powerful right hook that stunned Golota and sent him into the corner. With Golota's back now against the turnbuckle, Lewis proceeded to land a six-punch combination that sent Golota to the canvas. Golota was able to back up, but was clearly hurt from the exchange and had trouble finding his balance. Nevertheless, referee Joe Cortez allowed Golota to continue the fight but he was quickly met with a furious assault from Lewis, who landed an over 10-punch combination that again sent Golota down. Cortez quickly stopped the fight and Lewis was named the winner by knockout after only 95 seconds of action.

Aftermath
Golota was injected with lidocaine, a powerful painkiller, before the bout in an attempt to stave off knee pain. Golota had a seizure in the locker room about 15 minutes after the bout ended, during which he stopped breathing and was without a pulse for about 30 seconds. After being revived by cardiopulmonary resuscitation and rushed to the hospital, Golota's condition was upgraded to stable and he eventually made a full recovery. Golota was fined $5,000 for allowing the lidocaine injection. Golota filed a $21 million lawsuit against the doctor who administered the shot. The case was settled out of court for around $1 million.

Undercard
Confirmed bouts:

Broadcasting

References

Golota
World Boxing Council heavyweight championship matches
1997 in boxing
1997 in sports in New Jersey
October 1997 sports events in the United States
Boxing on HBO
Boxing matches at Boardwalk Hall